Dutch Girl is a 1953 German musical comedy film directed by Johann Alexander Hübler-Kahla and starring Sonja Ziemann, Gunnar Möller and Hans Moser. It was shot at the Spandau Studios in Berlin. The sets were designed by the art director Rolf Zehetbauer.

Synopsis
The film portrays the rivalry between a cheesemaker and a flower producer and the eventual love affair between their children.

Cast
 Sonja Ziemann as Antje
 Gunnar Möller as Jan
 Hans Moser as Knoop
 Grethe Weiser as Frau Quietsch
 Rudolf Platte as Brisling
 Paul Henckels as Leuwendahl
 Oskar Karlweis as Schmidtchen
 Carsta Löck as Frau Schmidtchen
 Wilfried Seyferth as Quietsch
 Ethel Reschke as Molly
 Rolf Weih as Polizeioffizier
 Wolfgang Neuss as Mr. Zimt
 Henry Lorenzen as Mr. Sugar
 Eduard Linkers as Polizeiwachtmeister
 Ursula Herking as Dienstmädchen
 Gert Kollat
 Wolfgang Jansen
 Bruce Low as Singer
 Werner Müller as himself
 Die Travellers as Singers
 Herbert Weissbach

References

Bibliography 
 Hans-Michael Bock and Tim Bergfelder. The Concise Cinegraph: An Encyclopedia of German Cinema. Berghahn Books, 2009.

External links 
 

1953 films
1953 musical comedy films
German musical comedy films
West German films
1950s German-language films
Films directed by Johann Alexander Hübler-Kahla
German black-and-white films
Films shot at Spandau Studios
1950s German films